State Route 258 (SR 258) is a 14.1 mile north–south secondary highway that traverses portions of Robertson and Sumner counties in Middle Tennessee. It is the most direct route from White House to Hendersonville.

Route description 
SR 258 begins in Sumner County in downtown Hendersonville at a junction with U.S. Route 31E (US 31E). It traverses and interchange with Vietnam Veterans Boulevard (SR 386, Exit 6) on the north side of town. It road bisects SR 174 (Long Hollow Pike) at Shackle Island. About  later, it arrives at a junction with US 31W, which also marks the Robertson–Sumner county line, at White House. SR 258 ends at a junction with SR 76 between the US 31W and Interstate 65 (I-65) corridors on the Robertson County side of White House.

Major intersections

References 

258
258
258

External links